Saba Valadkhan is an Iranian American biomedical scientist, and an Assistant Professor and RNA researcher at Case Western Reserve University in Cleveland, Ohio. In 2005, she was awarded the GE / Science Young Scientist Award for her breakthrough in understanding the mechanism of spliceosomes - "akin to finding the Holy Grail of the splicing catalysis field"  - a critical area of research, given that "20 percent or 30 percent of all human genetic diseases are caused by mistakes that the spliceosome makes".

Education 
Valadkhan qualified as a medical doctor at Tehran University of Medial Sciences in Iran in 1996. She moved to America to pursue her Ph.D. at Columbia University, New York. In 2004, she joined as an Assistant Professor Case Western Reserve University in Cleveland, Ohio.

Doctoral research 
Valadkhan studied the role of small nuclear RNAs in the human spliceosome under the supervision of Prof. James Manley. The main focus of her research is elucidating the structure and function of the catalytic core of the spliceosome by taking advantage of a novel, minimal spliceosome she recently developed. This minimal system, which consists of only two spliceosomal snRNAs, catalyzes a reaction identical to the splicing reaction. In addition to providing direct evidence for RNA catalysis in the spliceosome, and thus, settling the longstanding and central question of the identity of the catalytic domain, the minimal system provides a novel and powerful tool for studying the structure and function of the spliceosome.

Awards and honours 
Valadkhan was presented with the Harold Weintraub award from the Fred Hutchinson Cancer Research Center in Seattle for her doctoral thesis. She was named a Searle Scholar in 2004. She was also awarded the American Association for Advancement of Science (AAAS) Young Scientist Grand Prize in the same year.

In 2006, she became a founding member of the Rosalind Franklin Society. She was also honoured with the Nsoroma Award from Cleveland Chapter of the National Technical Association in 2006.

See also 
 List of famous Iranian women

References

External links
Interview

Women molecular biologists
Year of birth missing (living people)
Living people
Iranian women scientists
Iranian women physicians
Iranian emigrants to the United States
Columbia University alumni
Case Western Reserve University faculty
Iranian biologists
Molecular biologists
Iranian expatriate academics
20th-century Iranian physicians
Fred Hutchinson Cancer Research Center people